Huddersfield Town's 2008–09 campaign was the club's centenary season. The season did not end in promotion and if things had been left alone, relegation may have been a possibility.

After the disastrous start under Stan Ternent, Gerry Murphy led a recovery which continued under the new management team of Lee Clark, Terry McDermott, Derek Fazackerley and Steve Black.

They eventually finished in 9th place, but the season was noted mainly for it being the first time in 78 years that Town had completed the double over local rivals Leeds United, as well as for the retirement of local legend Andy Booth, who made 457 appearances over 2 spells at the club, scoring 150 goals, putting him in the top 5 of both appearances and goals in the club's history.

Squad at the start of the season

Review
On 6 May 2008, following the mixed season, new manager Stan Ternent released nine players from the club. They were Chris Brandon, Danny Schofield (who had already announced his plans to leave), Frank Sinclair, Matty Young, Aaron Hardy, Danny Racchi, Lucas Akins, Mitchell Bailey and Luke Malcher. Matt Glennon, Joe Skarz and James Berrett were offered new deals, while captain Rob Page had signed a pre-contract agreement with League 2 side Chesterfield, much to the disappointment of Ternent, who hadn't had chance to offer him a new contract at the Galpharm Stadium. The following day, Danny Schofield agreed a pre-contract agreement with fellow League 1 side Yeovil Town. On that same day, Matt Glennon signed a two-year contract with an optional third year and then Joe Skarz put pen to paper on his new three-year contract, the day after that. Recently called-up Ireland U-21 international James Berrett signed his new two-year deal on 13 May. On 30 May, Chris Brandon completed a move to his hometown club Bradford City. On 1 July, Frank Sinclair re-joined ex-Town manager Peter Jackson at Lincoln City. On 7 July, Matty Young joined Conference North side Harrogate Town. Aaron Hardy joined him there on 26 July. On 22 July, Lucas Akins made a surprise move to newly promoted Scottish Premier League side Hamilton Academical. 6 days later, Danny Racchi joined Bury. Mitchell Bailey joined Conference North side Hyde United on 7 August. On 11 August, central defender David Mirfin joined fellow League 1 side Scunthorpe United in a deal worth £150,000. Young defender Shane Killock joined Conference North side Harrogate Town on a month's loan on 1 September. He returned to Town on 7 October. He was loaned out to Oxford United on 2 January 2009. He signed a permanent deal at the Kassam Stadium on 3 February. Sierra Leonean international Malvin Kamara joined Football League Two side Grimsby Town on a month's loan on 24 September. He returned to the Galpharm on 25 October. On 23 October, Tom Clarke moved across West Yorkshire to Bradford City on a month's loan. The loan was extended, but he was recalled by Town on 3 December. On 27 November, Town sent 3 players out on loan just before the end of the transfer deadline window. Michael Flynn joined League 2 side Darlington and young duo Simon Eastwood and Tom Denton joined Conference National side Woking. Flynn returned to the Terriers on 29 December, Denton returned in January and Eastwood returned following an injury to Matt Glennon. Meanwhile, striker Luke Beckett left the club and joined Conference North side Gainsborough Trinity until the end of the season. Luke Malcher joined Harrogate Town on 11 December. Young striker Daniel Broadbent joined Rushden & Diamonds on loan on 15 January, he returned to the Galpharm on 16 February. 3 days later, he joined Town's new signing, Lee Novak, on loan at Gateshead, before returning on 19 March. On 24 March, he joined Harrogate Town on loan. Ex-captain Jon Worthington joined fellow League 1 side Yeovil Town on 30 January on a month's loan, which was extended, before he returned on 26 March. Keigan Parker joined fellow League 1 side Hartlepool United on loan on 2 March. Tom Denton joined his previous club Wakefield on loan on 6 March. He was joined there by fellow youngster Dan Codman on 10 March. Striker Phil Jevons joined League Two side Bury on a month's loan on 23 March. Joe Skarz joined Keigan Parker on loan at Hartlepool United on 26 March, as the loan window closed. David Unsworth, signed by Ternent at the start of the season was released from his contract on 30 March.

On 27 May, Stan Ternent made his first signing as Huddersfield Town manager. He signed Scottish striker Keigan Parker on a free transfer from Championship side Blackpool. On 5 June, Irish international Jim Goodwin joined Town on a 3-year deal from recently relegated Scunthorpe United. On 13 June, Huddersfield were drawn at home to rivals Bradford City in the first round of the League Cup. 3 days later, the new Football League fixtures were announced, Town's first game would be a home tie against recently promoted Stockport County. On 2 July, Town signed the ex-Scunthorpe United defender Andy Butler on a 3-year deal. Two days later, Chris Lucketti was brought back to Huddersfield from Sheffield United on a two-year contract, 7 years after leaving the Galpharm Stadium. On 23 July, Ternent made his fifth signing by bringing in Welshman Michael Flynn from Blackpool. Six days later, Gary Roberts joined from Ipswich Town for £250,000. On 8 August, just one day before the new season began, ex-Everton & West Ham United defender David Unsworth signed from Burnley, becoming Stan Ternent's 7th signing since becoming manager at the Galpharm. Also that day, Town were given a bye into the second round of the Football League Trophy. On 15 August, young striker Tom Denton was signed for £60,000 from Wakefield. Stan Ternent signed attacking midfielder Ian Craney for an undisclosed fee from Football League Two side Accrington Stanley on 18 August. The following day, striker Liam Dickinson was signed on loan from Championship side Derby County. That loan was extended by another month on 22 September. He eventually stayed until 17 November, when the 93-day limit expired. Stan Ternent also revealed on 5 September, that Town had failed to capture 3 strikers during the summer. They failed on bid of £850,000 for Town hero Jon Stead, who joined Ipswich Town in September, a £400,000 bid for Colchester United's Clive Platt and a £600,000 bid for Ipswich Town's Alan Lee, who subsequently moved to Championship side Crystal Palace. On 17 October, Town signed Steve Jones on loan from Burnley as cover for Andy Booth, who is out until the New Year with a back injury. He returned to Turf Moor on 26 November. On 20 January, Lee Clark made his first signing as manager by signing German left-back Dominik Werling on a free transfer. On 23 January, manager Clark made a double signing with the capture of winger Anthony Pilkington from Stockport County and striker Lionel Ainsworth from Watford. As the transfer deadline closed, Clark made three more signings, Lee Novak from Gateshead, who was then immediately sent back to Gateshead for the rest of the season. Jonathan Téhoué was signed on a free transfer from Turkish side Konyaspor. On 13 February, 11 days after the deal was originally agreed, Polish striker Lukas Jutkiewicz joined Town on loan from Premier League side Everton until the end of the season. Young Liverpool defender Martin Kelly was brought in on loan on 26 March, as the loan window shut.

After a disappointing opening to the season with a 1–1 draw against Stockport County, Town trounced neighbours Bradford City, on 12 August, 4–0 in the first round of the League Cup, with new signing Gary Roberts scoring a brace. Huddersfield were drawn at home to Championship side Sheffield United in the second round. They narrowly lost the tie by 2 goals to 1. Michael Flynn gave Town the lead with a deflected shot after 34 minutes. But, 2 goals in the last 10 minutes from the Blades from Darius Henderson and Kyle Naughton sent Town crashing out in the cruelest of fashions. On 6 September, Town were drawn away to League Two side Darlington in the second round of the Football League Trophy North-East section. They lost that match 1–0 on 7 October. In the FA Cup 1st round, Town were given a home tie against League Two side Port Vale. That match took place on 8 November and saw Town let a 3–1 lead slip to lose 4–3.

On 4 November, Stan Ternent left the Galpharm Stadium after just over 6 months in charge of the Terriers. To date, that is the shortest reign of any manager, with the exception of John Haselden and all the caretaker managers, in the club's 100-year history.

On 15 November, Murphy was in charge of his first league game in his 3rd spell as caretaker manager with a trip to Elland Road to play high-flyers and rivals Leeds United. Despite falling behind to a Robert Snodgrass goal in the 4th minute, Town scored a goal 27 seconds into the second half through Joe Skarz and then in the second minute of added time, Michael Collins scored to give Town a 2–1 win, which was also their first win at Elland Road since Boxing Day 1983.

On 10 December, after weeks of speculation, compensation was agreed with Norwich City for their assistant manager Lee Clark to be appointed as manager, with Derek Fazackerley as his new first team coach. They signed the contracts the following day and Clark officially took over on 15 December. The following week, Terry McDermott became the new assistant manager. Clark's first match was a home game against Hereford United on 20 December, which Town won 2–0. Clark's initial reign went well, winning 8 out of 9 matches soon after taking over. However, immediately after a 1–0 win over local rivals Leeds United once again, scoring in the first half and managing to keep the Whites out of the net under constant pressure, which once again placed them above Leeds in the table, disaster struck and a bad spell resulted in 8 consecutive games without a win, conceding 3 vital last minute goals 3 weeks in succession. The gap between Town and the playoffs widened, and a late bounce back was only enough to place them 9th in the table by the end of the season.

Squad at the end of the season

Players in and out

In

Out

Final league table

Results

Pre-season matches

Football League One

FA Cup

Football League Cup

Football League Trophy

Appearances & goals
Correct as of 2 May 2009.

References

Huddersfield Town A.F.C. seasons
Huddersfield Town